

Plants

Angiosperms

Arthropods

Insects

Archosauromorphs

Newly named non-avian dinosaurs
Data courtesy of George Olshevsky's dinosaur genera list.
 The dubious family, Ornitholestidae is named by Gregory Scott Paul.

Newly named birds

Pterosaurs

New taxa

References

 
Paleontology
Paleontology 8